Jessica Patterson is an American former professional motocross and enduro racer. She competed in the AMA Motocross Championships from 2000 to 2013. Patterson was one of the most accomplished female racers in the history of AMA motocross, winning 7 national championships.

Early life
Originally from Tallahassee, Florida, Patterson began riding motorcycles at the age of seven and qualified for her first Loretta Lynn's Amateur Motocross National Championship by age 12.

Career 
By the time she became a professional racer in 2000, Patterson had won 42 amateur championships. As a professional rider, Patterson went on to win the AMA Women's motocross national championship seven times starting in 2000. She appeared as a playable character in the 2002 motorcross video game Freekstyle. In 2013, she announced her intention to retire from motocross competitions at the end of the season. She then won the last motocross race of her career to clinch the 2013 Women's motocross national championship. Her 7 national championships are second only to the 9 championships won by Mercedes Gonzalez.

After her motocross racing career, she competed in the Grand National Cross Country enduro championship as well as in Endurocross competitions before retiring in 2015.

References 

Living people
Sportspeople from Tallahassee, Florida
American motocross riders
Enduro riders
Female motorcycle racers
American sportswomen
AMA Motocross Championship National Champions
21st-century American women
Year of birth missing (living people)